Rubén González (5 December 1927 – 13 June 2002) was a Chilean footballer.  He competed in the men's tournament at the 1952 Summer Olympics.

References

External links
 
 

1927 births
2002 deaths
Chilean footballers
Chile international footballers
Olympic footballers of Chile
Footballers at the 1952 Summer Olympics
Place of birth missing
Association football midfielders
Naval de Talcahuano footballers